In sport, a bye is the preferential status of a player or team that is automatically advanced to the next round of a tournament, without having to play an opponent in an early round.

In knockout (elimination) tournaments they can be granted either to reward the highest ranked participant(s) or assigned randomly, to make a working bracket if the number of participants is not a power of two (e.g. 16 or 32).

In round-robin tournaments, usually one competitor gets a bye in each round when there are an odd number of competitors, as it is impossible for all competitors to play in the same round. However, over the whole tournament, each plays the same number of games as well as sitting out for the same number of rounds. The "Berger Tables" used by FIDE for chess tournaments, provide pairings for even numbered pools and simply state that "Where there is an odd number of players, the highest number counts as a bye."

Similar to the round-robin context, in league sports with weekly regular-season play such as gridiron football or rugby, a team not scheduled to play on a given week or fixture (competition period) can be said to be on its "bye week". Byes are necessary if there is an odd number of teams, but may be used even with an even number of teams, such as to provide rest breaks as has been done in the National Football League (NFL).

Elimination tournaments

In a standard single-elimination tournament, each round has half the number of teams as the preceding round. Thus the finals will have two, the semi-finals will have four, the quarter finals will have eight, etc. Thus tournaments with competitors numbering a power of two can have a standard bracket in which all teams are paired up with the loser of each match eliminated and the winner moving on to the next round until only one champion remains.

However, if the number of teams is not a power of two, a simple elimination tournament would eventually produce a round with an odd number of teams (if the number is not odd to start with). For example, a tournament of nine teams could only have four matches in the first round, while a simple tournament of ten teams would produce a second round with five teams, meaning only two matches could occur.
Thus, if the number of participants is not a power of two (e.g. 16 or 32), to make a working bracket byes are provided to automatically move certain participants into a later round without requiring them to compete in an earlier one.

When participants are ranked, participants with the highest ranking going into the tournament are given a bye to the second round, as it is generally seen as an advantage to be assured entry into a later round. The Canadian Football League (CFL) also grants a bye to its two division winners, directly to the division finals as four other teams compete in a semi-final week. In other tournaments where teams are unranked, random draw may be used to determine the byes.

The number of teams offered a bye is generally designed to ensure that the next round consists of a power-of-two number of teams so the tournament can proceed as a simple single-elimination tournament from that round onward. 

If the byes are all single first-round byes into the second round of a tournament, the number of byes required is the difference between the number of teams and the next-highest power of two. For example, a 12-team tournament will require four byes (16−12) to ensure that instead of six teams in the second round, eight advance (as the four byes avoid two of the four teams being eliminated).

Examples from Gaelic football
In the Provincial Championships of Gaelic football, some teams receive a bye due to the irregular number of teams competing in each province. The different numbers resulted in different byes alignments in each Provincial Championship.

For example, below is an assessment of the 2012 Provincial Championships, and their use of the "bye".

Seven teams contested the 2012 Connacht Senior Football Championship, so a quarter-final was not played by Mayo. Mayo therefore advanced directly to the semi-final to await the winner of the game between Leitrim and London.

Eleven teams contested the 2012 Leinster Senior Football Championship, so five teams were given first round byes. Three teams (Carlow, Dublin and Wexford) played winners of the three preliminary matches, while the other two played each other in the quarter-finals without playing a game in the preliminary round.

Six teams contested the 2012 Munster Senior Football Championship, so two teams (Clare and Cork) were permitted to advance to the semi-finals without playing a game in the quarter-finals.

Nine teams contested the 2012 Ulster Senior Football Championship, so only Cavan and Donegal played in the preliminary round, while the other seven advanced via bye to the quarter-finals without playing a game in the preliminary round.

"Double byes"

While less common, byes can be offered for multiple rounds (e.g. a "double bye" directly into the third round), or starting in a later round (e.g. the top-ranked team in the first round is given a bye straight to the third round). A bye granted in a later round of the tournament eliminates the need for two byes in the previous round. 
 
In the English FA Cup, the football clubs in the top two league divisions receive two-round byes and enter in the third round "proper" (of eight); the two next-highest divisions' teams will have entered in the first round. Another example is the UEFA Europa League, where teams from the highest-ranked nations enter the group stage directly without having to go through qualification.

The WNBA, from 2016 to 2021, had granted double byes to the league's top two seeds, while the next two seeds got first-round byes for their playoffs.

In NCAA Division I basketball, the 2009 Big East men's basketball tournament introduced "double byes", as the conference invited all 16 members to participate for the first time (previously only the top twelve were invited). To limit the number of games each round to four, the four highest seeded teams were advanced to the third round of competition, the 5th-8th seeded teams given byes to the second round, and the bottom eight competed the first day.

Due to the realignment of major conferences, "double byes" were no longer needed by the Big East after 2013, but were added by the Southeastern Conference in 2013, the Atlantic Coast and Atlantic 10 conferences in 2014, and the Big Ten in 2015 as each expanded beyond 12 teams.  Various other conferences such as the WCC and the MAC offer a double bye to the semifinals for their top two teams.

Hidden byes (play-in games)

In certain tournaments, the byes are somewhat disguised. When more teams are given first-round byes than actually compete in the first round, these first games may be referred to as "play-in" games and might not be a formally labelled as a tournament round.

From 2012–2019 and 2021, the Major League Baseball playoffs has included ten teams consisting of six division winners and four wild card teams (the top-ranked non-division-winners). The first round of the playoffs consists two wild-card games: single-game matches in which the four wild-card teams are reduced to two. The winners move on to the Divisional series with the six division winners for an eight-team, three-round tournament. Although this is billed as adding two extra "one-game showdowns" to the post-season, it could also be viewed as adding a fourth round to the ten-team tournament with six byes for the division winners.

The FA Cup also has certain teams compete in up to 6 preliminary rounds to qualify for the first round "proper".

Another example is the NCAA basketball tournament, which since 2011 has had 68 teams, effectively granting 60 byes, while eight teams compete in the "First Four" games for remaining four spots in the round of 64. From 2011 to 2015, the "First Four" was considered the first round, the round of 64 played on Thursday and Friday, was called the "second round"; the round of 32 was then called the "third round", consisting of games played on Saturday and Sunday. In 2016, the naming reverted to the round of 64 being the "first round" once again, and the round of 32 being the "second round", though the play-in round and all eight of those teams are officially part of the tournament.

Bye weeks in football leagues

Certain professional rugby and gridiron football leagues use the term "bye week" for any week during the regular season in which a team does not play a game. (School teams may also have non-competing weeks, but these are scheduled by individual schools and more commonly termed "open dates".)

United States

Each NFL team has one "bye week" during a normal season; this is placed on the team's schedule, usually falling between Week 4 and Week 12 inclusive (except that if Thanksgiving falls during Week 12, the Dallas Cowboys and Detroit Lions may not have a bye during Week 12). 

During 1960 and 1966, the league had an odd number of teams due to expansion. Each week during those seasons, one team had a bye, including one team each in the first and last week of the season: thus, because they had to play all their games with no break in the middle, those two teams effectively had no byes. The American Football League (which at the time was a completely separate league, but later became the American Football Conference) also had an odd number of teams in 1966 and 1967 following the addition of the Miami Dolphins, leaving each team with two bye weeks. Again, from 1999 and 2001, the NFL had an odd number of teams (31) as a result of the Cleveland Browns re-entering the league. Each week during these three seasons featured at least one team with its bye week, but the 2001 season also added an additional impromptu league-wide bye the weekend after the September 11 attacks. The league returned to having an even number of teams (32) in the 2002 season with the addition of the Houston Texans, and implemented the current bye week system.

The NFL returned to the use of the bye week in  so as to extend the 16-game regular season schedule to span 17 weeks to increase the number of viewable games for television contracts. The  season spanned 18 weeks with each team having 2 bye weeks. It went back to 17 weeks with a bye week the next season through . Since , it's 18 weeks long with a bye week.

In the rare case of a game postponement that cannot be made up within the same week, the NFL may revise bye weeks assignments in order to reschedule the delayed game, making the postponement week those teams' new "bye week":
 Due to Hurricane Ike in 2008, the Baltimore Ravens' and the Houston Texans' Week 2 matchup in Houston was postponed, which also impacted the Cincinnati Bengals' schedule. The Bengals–Texans game was moved to Week 8, which was the originally scheduled bye week for both of those teams. This allowed the Ravens–Texans game (and the Bengals' bye week) to be rescheduled in Week 10, the Ravens' original bye Week.
 Due to Hurricane Irma in 2017, the Miami Dolphins and Tampa Bay Buccaneers Week 1 game was rescheduled to Week 11, the originally scheduled bye week for both teams.
 Due to the COVID-19 pandemic, several postponements occurred during the 2020 season. The first one that saw the league move games during bye weeks involved the Week 4 matchup between the Pittsburgh Steelers and Tennessee Titans, which also impacted the Baltimore Ravens' schedule. The Steelers-Titans game was moved to Week 7 (the Titans' original bye week) due to a rash of COVID-19 cases among the Titans organization. The Steelers matchup with the Ravens (their original Week 7 opponent) was moved to Week 8 when they both had scheduled byes and would allow the Steelers and Titans to make up their matchup; the Ravens bye week was moved to Week 7. Ravens head coach John Harbaugh, when asked about the schedule change, referenced the aforementioned changes with the Texans and Bengals in 2008 (his first year as Ravens head coach) and did not expect the changes to affect his team's planning.

The media may also sarcastically refer to a team having a "bye week" or a "second bye" if that team is playing an especially poor team, and is all but assured of a win.

Canada

Traditionally, the CFL has had nine teams and required bye weeks. Beginning 2018, each team has three bye weeks and 18 games over a 21-week regular season.

In most seasons, (from 2014 to 2017 and prior to 2007), each team has two bye weeks during the 20 week 18-game regular season.  When the league had only 8 teams, the league usually had no bye weeks.  However between 2007 and 2013, the league had one bye per team over in two weeks in August (4 teams would have a bye during week 6 and the other 4 teams would have a bye on week 7). Preseason have 3 weeks

Australia

In Australia's National Rugby League (NRL), each team has three byes each season. With the competition expanding to an odd number of teams from the 2023 NRL season, one club is required to have a bye each round; during the representative period of the season (such as the State of Origin), multiple byes are scheduled to the clubs that are expected to have the most players involved in the representative match, in the round preceding the representative fixture, to allow those clubs to sufficiently rest those players and prevent them from fielding a weakened side. On the competition ladder, teams are awarded two points (equivalent to a win) during their bye week except for the Melbourne Storm in 2010, who were barred from receiving premiership points for the remainder of the season as a punishment for gross long-term breaches of the salary cap.

The Australian Football League, which comprises an even number of clubs, gives each club a bye week in mid-season, as well as a bye the week before the finals. In 1915, 1919 to 1924, 1942 and 1943, 1991 to 1994 and 2011, when there were an odd number of clubs competing, each club was given two byes.

In both leagues, and under many other professional and amateur sports leagues in Australia, higher placed teams don't earn byes during finals, but instead the opportunity not to be eliminated by losing their first-round match (also called a double chance).  This practice is common in Australia, but it is not used in most other countries, to earn an easier passage to the Grand Final as reward for finishing higher on the ladder.  This is different from a double elimination format, in which a team has to lose both in the tournament and the repechage to be eliminated.

Gymnastics 

In a variation of the round-robin case, at certain high-level competitions in artistic gymnastics, teams cycle through the apparatuses in an "Olympic Order" with scheduled byes in between.

As an example, the NCAA Women's Gymnastics Championships has 36 teams with six teams apiece at six  regional sites, with 12 advancing to two semifinal rounds of six that decide participants for the final "Super Six". In each of these nine sextets, each team  competes during four of six "rotations" with the other two as byesscheduled before the uneven bars and the floor exercise. For example, Semifinal II of the 2018 championships operated as follows

Swiss system tournaments
In a Swiss-system tournament with an odd number of players, one player gets a bye in each round, but not all players will get a bye (as there are fewer rounds than there are players). FIDE specifies that "pairing-allocated" byes in their sanctioned chess tournaments may not be awarded multiple times to the same participant. Contrasting use in some single-elimination brackets, the byes are to be allocated to the lowest-rated eligible player in the pool.

References

Sports terminology